Johann Fritz may refer to:
 Johann Fritz (ice hockey)
 Johann Fritz (piano maker)